The Acre tody-tyrant (Hemitriccus cohnhafti) is a species of bird in the family Tyrannidae, found in Bolivia and Brazil. 
Its natural habitat is subtropical or tropical moist lowland forests.

The Acre tody-tyrant was first described as a species in 2013, and its history is largely unknown to ornithology.  It eats insects in the understory of its forest habitat.

Appearance 
The acre tody-tyrant is a small bird in the tyrant flycatcher family.  It is mostly olive drab in color, with bronze-colored wingbars. Its breast has pale yellow streaks. The nostrils are large and prominent.

References

 Zimmer, K. J.; Whittaker, A.; Sardelli, C.; Guilherme, and Aleixo, A. (2013) A new species of Hemitriccus tody-tyrant from the state of Acre, Brazil. In: J. del Hoyo, A. Elliott e D. Christie. (Org.). Handbook of the Birds of the World, Special Volume: New Species and Global Index. 1ed.Barcelona: Lynx Edicions, 292–296.

Acre tody-tyrant
Birds of the Amazon Basin
Birds of the Bolivian Amazon
Acre tody-tyrant
Acre tody-tyrant
Acre tody-tyrant